The 1999 Tour de Suisse was the 63rd edition of the Tour de Suisse cycle race and was held from 15 June to 24 June 1999. The race started in Solothurn and finished in Winterthur. The race was won by Francesco Casagrande of the Vini Caldirola team.

Teams
Seventeen teams of up to nine riders started the race:

 
 
 
 
 
 
 
 
 
 
 
 
 
 
 
 
 Ericsson–Villiger

Route

General classification

Notes

References

1999
Tour de Suisse